"Setting Fires" is a song by American DJ duo The Chainsmokers, released as the final single from the duo's second extended play, Collage (2016). It features the vocal collaboration of American electronic music duo Xylø. The song was written by Melanie Fontana, Jon Asher and Andrew Taggart.  "Setting Fires" was released on November 4, 2016, through Disruptor Records and Columbia Records.

Composition

The song is written in the key of G♯ minor with a common time tempo of 105 beats per minute. Xylø's vocals span from F♯3 to A♯5 in the song.

Chart performance

"Setting Fires" debuted and peaked at number 71 on the US Billboard Hot 100 issued for November 26, 2016. The Recording Industry Association of America (RIAA) certified the song Gold, which denotes 500,000 units based on sales and track-equivalent on-demand streams. On the Hot Dance/Electronic Songs chart, it entered at number eight and spent 20 weeks in total. "Setting Fires" peaked at number 35 on the Canadian Hot 100 and was certified Gold by Music Canada. The song reached number 50 in Australia and was certified Platinum. It charted within the top 40 of national record charts, at number 26 in Scotland, and number 31 in Czech Republic.

Track listing

Personnel 

Credits adapted from the EP liner notes, Collage (2016).

 Jordan "DJ Swivel" Youngproducer, mixing engineer, recording engineer
 The Chainsmokersproducer, associated performer
 Xyløassociated performer
 Melanie Fontanabackground vocals
 Chris Gehringermastering engineer

Charts

Weekly charts

Year-end charts

Certifications

References

2016 songs
2016 singles
Dance-pop songs
Electronic dance music songs
Columbia Records singles
Songs written by Melanie Fontana
Songs written by Andrew Taggart
Disruptor Records singles
Songs written by Jon Asher